The 100: A Ranking of the Most Influential Persons in History is a 1978 book by Michael H. Hart, an American astrophysicist, author, amateur historian, researcher, and  white separatist. Published by his father's publishing house, it was his first book and was reprinted in 1992 with revisions. It is a ranking of the 100 people who, according to Hart, most influenced human history. Unlike various other rankings at the time, Hart was not attempting to rank on "greatness" as a criterion, but rather whose actions most changed the course of human history.

Summary 
The book consists of 100 entries as well as an appendix of Honorable Mentions. Each entry is a short biography of the person, followed by Hart's thoughts on how this person was influential and changed the course of human history. He gave additional credit for importance for people whose actions Hart felt were unusual, unlikely, or ahead of their time compared to a hypothesized course of history had this person not lived.

Founders and shapers of successful religions were among the most influential in Hart's view, as these shaped many people's lives quite strongly over a long period of time. The first person on Hart's list is the Islamic prophet Muhammad. Hart asserted that Muhammad was "supremely successful" in both the religious and secular realms, being responsible for both the foundations of Islam as well as the Early Muslim conquests uniting the Arabian Peninsula and eventually a wider caliphate after his death. Hart also believed that Muhammad played an unusually singular and personal role in the development of Islam. The development of Christianity, by contrast, has its influence split between Jesus's initial teachings and foundational work, and Paul the Apostle, who played a pivotal role in the early spread of Christianity as well as distinguishing its doctrines and practices from Judaism and the other Greek and Roman religions of the time period. Gautama Buddha, Confucius, and Moses are all placed highly as well due to their role in establishing religions.

One of the most notable omissions was Abraham Lincoln, which Hart relegated to the "Honorary Mentions" in the appendix. Changes in the 1992 revision include the rankings of figures associated with Communism being lowered after the Revolutions of 1989, such as Vladimir Lenin and Mao Zedong, and the introduction of Mikhail Gorbachev. Hart took sides in the Shakespearean authorship issue and replaced William Shakespeare with Edward de Vere, 17th Earl of Oxford in the 1992 version. Hart also substituted Niels Bohr and Henri Becquerel with Ernest Rutherford. Henry Ford was promoted from the "Honorary Mentions" list, replacing Pablo Picasso. Finally, various rankings were re-ordered, although no one listed in the top ten changed their position.

The book was first published in 1978 as imprint from "Hart Publishing Company". According to the Calgary Herald, at least 60,000 copies were sold. The book has since been translated into many languages.

Hart's Top 10 (from the 1992 edition)

Reviews 
It has been reviewed by:
 the Detroit Free Press
 the Jackson, Mississippi Clarion Ledger
 the Tampa Tribune 
 the Los Angeles Times
 the New York Daily News 
 the South Bend Tribune 
 the Tallahassee Democrat 
 the San Francisco Chronicle
 Business Horizons
 the Richmond Times-Dispatch notes
 the Chicago Tribune 
 the Miami Herald
 the Columbus Dispatch
 the Washington Times
 the Lancaster Eagle-Gazette
 the Asbury Park Press
 the Pittsburgh Post-Gazette
 El Nuevo Herald 
 the Canberra Times

Reviews 
Positive reviews
 In 1988, Hosni Mubarak, the President of Egypt, honored Michael H. Hart, the author of the book, in Cairo for naming Mohammed as the most influential person in history.Egypt will honor Michael H. Hart, an Anne Arundel Community College professor of astronomy who stunned the scientific community in the '70s by questioning the existence of extraterrestrials, for a feat having nothing to do with the stars.Mr. Hart, who also has garnered acclaim as an amateur historian, will be honored Sunday in Cairo by Egyptian President Hosni Mubarak for naming Mohammed, the founder of Islam, the world's second-most-followed religion, as the most influential person in history.Mohammed was awarded the top spot in Mr. Hart's controversial 1978 book, "The 100: A Ranking of the Most Influential Persons in History," for more than religious reasons, the author said.
Michael Gartner in The Wall Street Journal
 Mike Barnicle in The Boston Globe
 The Washington Post 
 Albert Hofammann in The Morning Call 
 Jane Sullivanin in The Age Arnie Arnesen in The Boston Globe Janice Harayda in The Plain DealerMixed reviews
 Ken McGoogan wrote in the Calgary Herald wrote, "If Michael H. Hart has done nothing else, he has demonstrated that picking a public fight can be profitable. Hart is the author of The 100: A Ranking of the Most Influential Persons in History, revised and updated for the '90s (Citadel Press, $24)"
 Charles Solomon in the Los Angeles Times Frederic Raphael in The Sunday Times Barbara W. Tuchman in The Washington Post Edwin O. Reischauer in The Washington Post Walter C. Langsam in The Cincinnati Enquirer Reception 
For placing Muhammad in first place of the list, the book received several controversial reviews from western critics, but the book was widely welcomed and outburst with positive reviews in the Muslim world, and the book is often cited in the Muslim writers' book including Ayatollah Sayed Muhammad al-Shirazi, Ahmed Deedat etc. In 1988, the former contemporary Egyptian president Hosni Mubarak honored Michael Hart for placing Muhammad in first place. Steven Skiena and Charles Ward writes in their book Who's Bigger?: Where Historical Figures Really Rank that The 100: A Ranking of the Most Influential Persons in History "is probably the best known ranking of historic figures by influence."

 Sequel 
Hart wrote a follow-up in 1999, entitled A View from the Year 3000, voiced in the perspective of a person from that future year and ranking the most influential people in history. Roughly half of the entries are fictional people from 2000–3000, but the remainder are actual people. These were taken mostly from the 1992 edition, with some re-ranking of order.

 See also 
 Time 100
 Who's Bigger: Where Historical Figures Really Rank''

References 

1978 non-fiction books
20th-century history books
Top people lists
Cultural depictions of Muhammad
Depictions of Jesus in literature
Cultural depictions of Moses
Literature controversies